Mike Hull may refer to:

Mike Hull (fullback) (born 1945), American football fullback
Mike Hull (linebacker) (born 1991), American football linebacker from Penn State who plays for the Miami Dolphins